Aaron Woods (born 13 March 1991) is an Australian rugby league forward who plays for the St George Illawarra Dragons in the NRL.

He previously captained Wests Tigers and played for the Canterbury-Bankstown Bulldogs and Cronulla-Sutherland Sharks in the National Rugby League. He has played at representative level for the Prime Minister's XIII, NSW City Origin and New South Wales in the State of Origin series.

Early life
Woods was born in Sydney, New South Wales, Australia and was raised by his mother in an apartment above a newsagent on Norton Street, Leichhardt. He has spoken of the influence of the women in his life. He said, "My dog is female, I was a mummy's boy and a nanna's boy, my aunties would bash me and pick on me like a young brother, my missus is strong and stable, my youngest sister is my biggest fan. They’ve all been great for me."

Woods played junior rugby league with Leichhardt Juniors and participated in the Balmain Tigers Development Program. He based his game on players Jason Ryles and Ben Kennedy. He attended Holy Cross College, Ryde, and represented NSW Catholic Colleges when he was 17. In 2008, he played for the Australian schoolboys team.

In 2009, Woods played for Wests Tigers' Toyota Cup (Under-20s) team in their run to the Grand Final, but 2010 was mired by injury, with his hamstring coming close to being torn completely off the bone. However, before the start of the 2011 season, Ricky Stuart named him in a "Blues in Waiting" squad, for potential future NSW State of Origin players. He was described as one of, "the State's best crop of young talent."

Playing career

2011-12
Woods made his NRL debut for the Wests Tigers at the start of the 2011 season, the day after his 20th birthday. He came off the bench with 20 minutes remaining in the game against Canterbury. Woods later said, "It was a Monday night against a pretty handy side. It was unreal.
I’ll never forget running at Andrew Ryan and Corey Payne, thinking gee this is the NRL. I got up thinking far out, that was a good hit. But after that the nerves were gone."

Woods scored a try in his 4th appearance. He was a regular in the first-grade team throughout the year, mostly starting from the bench. His first season form was described as, "impressive," and, "one of the few constants in an erratic Wests Tigers' NRL season." He was named the club's rookie of the year.

With the departure of Bryce Gibbs and Todd Payten, Woods became a starting prop at the start of 2012 season. After seven weeks, Woods made his senior representative debut with City Origin. Coach Brad Fittler said of his performance, "I thought he was the best prop on the field. I'm sure he'll build from this, and whether it's this year or next year, he looks like someone who can make the step up."

Woods was named as a standby player for NSW in the first two State of Origin matches of 2012, to cover for any late injuries. It was commented in the press that he had, "arguably been the form front-rower of the competition so far." Over the season he made 377 runs for 3455 metres and made 808 tackles, placing him near the best in the NRL in yardage, and in the top twenty in tackles made. He was one only 3 Wests Tigers players to appear in every game throughout the season, and was named the club's Player of the Year. At the end of the year he was nominated for Prop of the Year at the Dally M awards. Steve Roach later said, "He virtually carried them [the Tigers] last year, when Galloway was injured. I reckon, along with James Tamou, he's the best ball-running front-rower in the comp."

2013
In 2013, Woods made his State of Origin debut in game two after James Tamou was suspended for a drink-driving offence. He also played in the third game of the series, but saw limited time on the field in both matches. Playing for the Wests Tigers, Woods was averaging a high 60 minutes per game in an inexperienced front row, before succumbing to injury late in the season. Woods later signed a contract to remain with the Wests Tigers for a further three seasons.

2014
Despite a lucrative offer from Manly, Woods say he was unable to leave Wests Tigers. "It was a mental thing. I love to be in the comfort zone, so I stayed here. Also, the Wests Tigers looked after me. I had a few injuries and they stuck by me; guess I was ready to give back what they gave to me."

Thought by some to be the form prop during the early NRL rounds, he was considered unlucky not to be selected in the 2014 ANZAC Test. Woods went on to be named as a starting prop for New South Wales in the 2014 State of Origin series. He was one of three NSW players to carry the ball 100 metres in game one, and then contributed to the team winning its first series in nine years.

Woods finished 2014 as the Tigers' leader in offloads and hitups, scoring a personal best 4 tries. In round 9, he co-captained the team for the first time with Chris Lawrence. At the end of the season, Woods was again chosen to play for Prime Minister's XIII, scoring two tries, and was described as "the dominant player up the middle."

2015
In May, Woods was chosen as one of Australia's starting props in the Anzac Test. Despite Woods making, "plenty of metres" and having, "a strong work rate", the team suffered a comprehensive defeat. A third of the way through the season, Woods was averaging 215 metres a game, 50 more than the next best prop in the competition.

Woods was again chosen as a starting prop for NSW in the 2015 State of Origin series. Playing in a losing team in game one, he ran for 141 metres with the ball and made 41 tackles without a miss, with the Herald Sun asking, "Is there any doubting now he's the game's new top prop?" In the second game, he ran for a game-high 150 metres and brushed past opponent Matt Scott to score a try in the second half that saw NSW take a match-winning lead. Although not awarded the Man of the Match, he was given 3 Dally M points for being rated the best player on the field, momentarily placing him first on the Dally M leader-board. However, in the third match, Woods was criticised for conceding too many penalties in the Blues series-deciding loss.

Despite missing games due to State of Origin and injury, Woods was in the competition's top 20 players for hit-ups and yardage and was named at prop in the NRL website's team of the year. In the absence of Robbie Farah, Woods captained Wests Tigers in 4 matches, all of which were losses. Woods capped off the season with the Dally M Prop of the Year award and finished runner up in the Dally M Player of the Year to Johnathan Thurston.

2016
Woods succeeded Farah as Wests Tigers captain from 2016. He claimed his leadership technique was to, "just remain calm. People ask how the captaincy has changed things for me but I'll never change my role in the side no matter what I have next to my name. We're all equal... I just do a little bit more talking at press conferences, man."

A "near certain" selection for the Anzac Test, Woods was unable to play after suffering ligament damage and bone bruising in his ankle in round 6. At the time, he was the competition's leader for metres gained with the ball. He returned in round 10 and was chosen for New South Wales. The Blues lost the first 2 games with Woods being very blunt when asked by Channel 9 commentators how he felt seeing Queensland win another series Woods said "It's shithouse," Woods told Channel Nine. "It's probably the best way to put it. We just let them off the hook again tonight like game one". Woods was described as, "The best prop on the ground in the first half with several strong carries. The only NSW forward to run 100 metres," in game 2. He had the most metres for any forward on the ground when NSW won the third game of the series.

Making 19 appearances for Wests Tigers, he was the club's leader in hit ups, and had a club-high average of 160 metres per game in attack. At year's end, he was chosen in the Australian squad for the Four Nations, but was absent from the test against New Zealand due to his wedding. Coach Mal Meninga said, "The timing is not perfect but family comes first and you’ve got to keep the wives happy don’t you?" He was the starting prop in all four Four Nations matches, which were all victories.

2017
In March and April, Woods, alongside Tigers fullback James Tedesco and Tigers halves Luke Brooks and Mitchell Moses, attracted media speculation about where the players, dubbed the "Big Four" would play after all of their contracts with the Tigers were set to expire at season's end. With Woods linked to the Canterbury-Bankstown Bulldogs, the Wests Tigers imposed a deadline for Woods to re-sign by 21 April. When Woods' manager did not respond by the cut-off, the Wests Tigers contract offer was withdrawn. Wests Tigers CEO Justin Pascoe said, "We're really comfortable with the fact that we afforded the players every opportunity that we could to stay at the club."

Before the Wests Tigers' next match, which was against Canterbury, Woods was booed by sections of the crowd before the game, but was awarded the man of the match for his performance. Soon after he signed a four-year deal with the Canterbury club. Woods later said, "I’m not proud of how things went down. At the time I thought what I was doing was right, but looking back I should’ve handled things differently. I was the captain of the Wests Tigers. I grew up around the corner from Leichhardt Oval. I lost sight of what that meant and the responsibility I had continuing the legacy of the guys that came before me."

On 30 July, Woods scored his first try of the year as Wests defeated Gold Coast 26–4.

2018
Woods made his debut for Canterbury in their round 1 loss against Melbourne.  Following the game, Woods was mocked on social media and by current players for his new haircut.  His trademark flowing locks were replaced by a bob hairstyle which prompted some cutting remarks.  Woods was initially surprised by all the attention and told the media "I copped a bit of flack during the week, There was Dora The Explorer, that Lord Farquaad bloke (from Shrek). It was a haircut gone wrong ... but I have to move on; the best way was to shave it off.  Everyone is worrying about the hair. I am worrying about playing good footy for the Bulldogs".

Woods was not selected by NSW coach Brad Fittler for the 2018 State of Origin series, ending a run of 14 straight games. Woods learned of his non-selection while sitting next to teammate David Klemmer who had received a phone call from Fittler telling him he was in the team but Woods received none. On 26 June, Woods left the Canterbury-Bankstown club, through a mid year switch, to join the Cronulla-Sutherland Sharks. Later that day, his name was listed to face the New Zealand Warriors on his Cronulla debut. He had played 14 games for Canterbury for just 3 wins, with no points scored. 

Woods would go on to make a total of 12 appearances for Cronulla in 2018 as the club reached the preliminary final but fell short of a grand final appearance losing to Melbourne.

2019
On 8 April 2019, Woods was ruled out for three months after suffering a fractured foot in Cronulla's round 4 loss against the Parramatta Eels.
He made his return in round 15 against his former club Canterbury-Bankstown, playing from the bench as Cronulla lost the match 14–12.

At the end of the season, Cronulla finished in 7th spot and qualified for the finals.  Woods played in the club's elimination final defeat against Manly.

2020
Woods played 21 games for Cronulla in the 2020 NRL season as the club finished 8th and qualified for the finals. He played in Cronulla's elimination final loss against Canberra.

2021
On 3 June 2021, Woods was informed by the Cronulla outfit that his services would not be required beyond the end of the season. In October, he joined Cronulla's arch-rivals St. George Illawarra for 2022.

2022
In round 1 of the 2022 NRL season, Woods made his club debut for St. George Illawarra in their 28-16 victory over the New Zealand Warriors.
Woods played 19 games for the club throughout 2022 as they finished 10th on the table and missed the finals for a fourth straight season.

References

External links

Cronulla Sharks profile
Canterbury Bulldogs profile
Wests Tigers profile
NRL profile
2017 RLWC profile

 

1991 births
Living people
Australia national rugby league team players
Canterbury-Bankstown Bulldogs players
Cronulla-Sutherland Sharks players
New South Wales City Origin rugby league team players
New South Wales Rugby League State of Origin players
Prime Minister's XIII captains
Rugby league players from Sydney
Rugby league props
St. George Illawarra Dragons players
Wests Tigers players